Jason Charlie (J. C.) Duncan (born June 27, 1929) was an American politician in the state of South Carolina. He served in the South Carolina House of Representatives as a member of the Democratic Party from 1969 to 1972 and 1975 to 1980, representing Spartanburg County, South Carolina. He was a farmer, Methodist preacher, teacher, college professor and realtor.

References

1929 births
Living people
Democratic Party members of the South Carolina House of Representatives
People from Lyman, South Carolina
Farmers from South Carolina